Jacob Ola Fasipe was an Anglican bishop in Nigeria: he was Bishop of Oyo until he was succeeded on his retirement by Williams Oluwarotimi Aladekugbe in 2014.

Fasipe was educated at Immanuel College of Theology, Ibadan and Trinity College, Dublin.

He was enthroned as the pioneer Bishop of Oyo in 2004.

Notes

People from Edo State
Living people
Anglican bishops of Oyo
21st-century Anglican bishops in Nigeria
University of Ibadan alumni
Alumni of Trinity College Dublin
Year of birth missing (living people)